Chahar Borji (also Romanized as Chahār Borjī) is a village in Dasht-e Taybad Rural District, Miyan Velayat District, Taybad County, Razavi Khorasan Province, Iran. At the 2006 census, its population was 1,413, in 292 families.

References 

Populated places in Taybad County